The 1984–85 Gamma Ethniki was the second season since the official establishment of the third tier of Greek football in 1983. Panetolikos and Kilkisiakos were crowned champions in Southern and Northern Group respectively, thus winning promotion to Beta Ethniki. Ionikos and Naoussa also won promotion as a runners-up of the groups.

Chania, Nikaia Panegialios, Aias Salamina, Florina, Elassona, Aspida Xanthi, Alexandroupolis and Anagennisi Epanomi were relegated to Delta Ethniki.

Southern Group

League table

Northern Group

League table

Relegation play-off

|}

References

Third level Greek football league seasons
3
Greece